The Order of Logohu is the principal order of the Order of Papua New Guinea. Logohu is a Motuan word for the bird-of-paradise, the official national symbol of Papua New Guinea since its independence.  The Order consists of four ranks.

Classes of the Order

Grand Companion of the Order of Logohu 
The Grand Companion of the Order of Logohu (GCL) is awarded to those citizens of Papua New Guinea and others for service, achievement, and merit in the highest degree, sustained over a period of twenty years.  The award may be given to no more than fifty living persons. Recipients of the Grand Companion class are titled "Chief". The Chancellor of the Order of Logohu is titled as "Grand Chief" as well as one other living recipient of the class. The title of Grand Chief is currently held by Grand Chief Sir Bob Dadae .

Officer of Logohu
The Officer of Logohu (OL) is awarded for distinguished service to Papua New Guinea, or to a local community, sustained over a period of at least ten years.

Member of Logohu
The Member of Logohu (ML) is awarded for commendable service to a particular area of endeavour, to Papua New Guinea, or to a local community, sustained over a period of at least seven years.

National Logohu Medal
The National Logohu Medal (LM) is awarded for exemplary service in a profession, career, or industry group, or to the general community, over a period of at least five years.

Current Composition 
Sovereign: Charles III
Chancellor: Grand Chief Sir Bob Dadae 

Royal Chiefs
 The Princess Royal (2005)

Grand Companions
 Dame Josephine Abaijah  – First Woman elected to the PNG Parliament
 Sir Julius Chan  (2005) – Former Prime Minister of PNG
 John Momis  (2005)  – Long Serving Parliamentarian and Framer of the PNG constitution
 Sir Donatus Mola   (2005) – Former Bougainville Chief
 Sir Rabbie Namaliu  (2009) – Former Prime Minister of PNG
Archbishop Karl Hesse,  – Catholic Archbishop Emeritus of Rabaul
 Boyamo Sali  (2009) – Former Cabinet Minister of PNG
 Mathew Siune  (2009) – Former Cabinet Minister of PNG
Sir Akepa Miakwe (2011) – Former politician of Unggai-Bena in Eastern Highlands
Sir Brian Barnes  (2011) – Former Archbishop of Port Moresby Catholic Archdiocese

Honorary Grand Companions
Bill Clinton (2006) – Former President of the USA
Susilo Bambang Yudhoyono (2010) – Former President of the Republic Of Indonesia

Precedence
The precedence of the classes of the Order of Logohu vary, they are as follows:

References

Orders, decorations, and medals of Papua New Guinea
Recipients of the Order of Logohu